Vflo is a commercially available, physics-based distributed hydrologic model generated by Vieux & Associates, Inc.  Vflo uses radar rainfall data for hydrologic input to simulate distributed runoff. Vflo employs GIS maps for parameterization via a desktop interface.  The model is suited for distributed hydrologic forecasting in post-analysis and in continuous operations.  Vflo output is in the form of hydrographs at selected drainage network grids, as well as distributed runoff maps covering the watershed. Model applications include civil infrastructure operations and maintenance, stormwater prediction and emergency management, continuous and short-term surface water runoff, recharge estimation, soil moisture monitoring, land use planning, water quality monitoring, and water resources management.

History 
Vflo considers the spatial character of the parameters and precipitation controlling hydrologic processes, and thus improves upon lumped representations previously used in hydrologic modeling.  Historical practice has been to use lumped representations because of computational limitations or because sufficient data was not available to populate a distributed model database.  Advances in computational speed; development of high-resolution precipitation data from radar and satellites; and availability of worldwide digital data sets and GIS technology makes distributed, physics-based modeling possible.  Vflo is designed to take advantage of the spatial variability of high resolution radar rainfall input, GIS datasets, and hydraulic channel characteristics.  Because it is physics-based, it produces hydrographs based on conservation equations and the hydraulics of the drainage network, and can be employed in locations where there are no rain gauges or previous modeling studies.  In addition, Vflo’s network approach makes models scalable from upland watersheds to river basins using the same drainage network.

Formulation 
Vflo is suited for distributed hydrologic forecasting in post-analysis and continuous operations.  Vflo models may be calibrated by loading precipitation maps for historical events and comparing simulated volume/peak hydrographs to observed hydrographs.  Elevation data are taken from a digital elevation model.  A vector channel representation is employed.  Parameterization utilizes digital data sets at any resolution, including LIDAR terrain data and other digital maps of impervious area, soils, and land use/cover.  Vflo is developed to utilize multi-sensor inputs from radar, satellites, rain gauges, or model forecasts.  The kinematic wave analogy is used to represent hydraulic conditions in a watershed.

Specific simulation options 
Rainfall input
Radar-rainfall: UF, ASCII, NEXRAD Level II, CSV
Satellite data
Rain gauges, Barnes objective analysis
Quantitative precipitation estimates from model forecasts
Multi-sensor precipitation estimates
Evapotranspiration
Snowmelt
Sensitivity analysis
Inundation mapping
Infiltration
Enhanced Green-Ampt infiltration module with initial saturation calibration factor (slider), saturated hydraulic conductivity, wetting front suction, effective porosity, and soil depth
Abstraction and impervious area parameters with ASCII import/export
Overland flow
Manning's equation
Channel flow
Kinematic Wave Analogy
Modified Puls
Observed flow
Looped rating curve modification (Jones method)
Rating curves and cross sections for complex hydraulics
Flood watch points
Design storms, SCS, user generated

Applications 
Continuous and short-term surface water runoff
Stormwater prediction and management
Flash flood forecasting
Operational flood alert
Flood event reconstruction
Design Storm development
Recharge estimation
Soil moisture monitoring
Hydrology and Hydraulics studies
Land use planning scenarios
Water quality studies
Hydropower management
Hydrology education
Hydrologic research

References 

Integrated hydrologic modelling
Hydrology models
Environmental engineering
Stormwater management
Hydraulic engineering
Water resources management
Finite element software
Computer-aided engineering software
Finite element method
Applied mathematics
Mathematical modeling
Radar meteorology